Angela "Angie" Rachael Beard (born 16 August 1997) is an Australian soccer player, who currently plays for Western United in the Australian A-League Women. She has previously played for Brisbane Roar and Melbourne Victory in the Australian A-League Women, for KR in the Icelandic Úrvalsdeild kvenna, and for Fortuna Hjørring in the Danish Women's League. She has represented Australia’s U-17 and U-20 youth level teams as well as the senior level three times. In 2022 she stated her intention to represent the Philippines but has not been capped yet.

Club career

Brisbane Roar
Beard made her debut for Brisbane Roar on 14 September 2014 in a match against Perth Glory. She made five appearances for the team during the 2014–15 W-League season. The Roar finished in sixth place during the regular season with a  record.

Returning to the Roar for the 2015–16 W-League season, Beard helped the team finish in fourth place during the regular season securing a berth to the playoffs. During a match against Melbourne Victory on 9 January, Beard scored a goal in the third minute of stoppage time lifting the final score to 4–0. During the semifinal match against regular season champions Melbourne City, the Roar was defeated 5–4 in a penalty kick shootout after 120 minutes of regular and overtime produced no goals for either side.

Beard was named the November 2015 nominee for the 2015/16 W-League Young Footballer of the Year award. Of the nomination, she said, "This is only my second season in the Westfield W-League and I feel very privileged to be recognised at this early stage of my career." Following her performance in the 2016 W-League semifinal against Melbourne City, team captain and Matilda Clare Polkinghorne said, "she’s got a really bright career ahead of her. She’s only 18 years old, she’s going to be a real force in Australian football." She was later named the Women's Player of the Year by the club.

Melbourne Victory
On 19 September 2017, Beard joined Melbourne Victory on a one-year deal, re-joining coach Jeff Hopkins. Beard has since re-signed for Melbourne Victory on a two-year deal.

Fortuna Hjørring
In June 2021, Beard sealed a move to Danish club Fortuna Hjørring, joining Australians Indiah-Paige Riley, Alexandra Huynh, and Clare Wheeler.

Western United
In January 2023, Beard returned to Australia joining A-League Women expansion club Western United on a two-year deal.

International career

Australia
Beard has represented Australia on the under-17 and under-20 national teams. In January 2016, she was called up to training camp for the senior national team. In September 2021, Beard made her senior debut in a friendly against the Republic of Ireland.

Philippines
Beard is eligible to represent the Philippines through her mother, who is from Cebu. On 2 October 2022, Beard was invited to the training camp of the Philippines prior to the team's friendlies against Costa Rica.

Career statistics

Club 

1Icelandic Women's Football Cup.
2Danish Women's Cup.

Honours 
with Brisbane Roar
 Westfield W-League, NAB Young Footballer of the Year nominee: 2015/16
 Player of the Year 2015/16
 Player's Player 2015/16

See also

References

Further reading
 Grainey, Timothy (2012), Beyond Bend It Like Beckham: The Global Phenomenon of Women's Soccer, University of Nebraska Press, 
 Stewart, Barbara (2012), Women's Soccer: The Passionate Game, Greystone Books,

External links

 
 Brisbane Roar player profile
 

1997 births
Living people
Australian women's soccer players
Brisbane Roar FC (A-League Women) players
Melbourne Victory FC (A-League Women) players
Fortuna Hjørring players
Western United FC (A-League Women) players
A-League Women players
Elitedivisionen players
Women's association football defenders
Australian expatriate sportspeople in Denmark
Expatriate women's footballers in Denmark
KR women's football players
Expatriate women's footballers in Iceland
Australian expatriate sportspeople in Iceland
Australian expatriate women's soccer players